Matthew Edgar (born 28 August 1986) is an English darts player currently competing in Professional Darts Corporation (PDC) events.

Career

2011
Edgar joined the PDC in 2011, and qualified for the UK Open. He defeated Nigel Heydon, Andy Pearce and Martyn Turner on the way to the last 32, where he lost 5–9 to Andy Boulton.

2012
In January 2012, he entered the Professional Darts Corporation Pro Tour 'Q School' qualifying tournament.
On the first day, Edgar lost to Darren Whittingham 6–4 at the final stage.
After four days playing in the event in Barnsley, Edgar gained his professional tour card for the 2012 and 2013 seasons. His best results of 2012 came in two UK Open Qualifiers, where he lost in the last 16 to Johnny Haines and Richie Howson respectively. These results helped him to reach the UK Open for the second time where he was beaten in the second round by Kevin McDine. He could not advance beyond the last 32 in any of the rest of the events he played in the year.

2013
Edgar went into 2013 ranked world number 81, and reached his first PDC quarter-final at the eighth UK Open Qualifier where he was edged out 5–6 by Adrian Lewis. He was seeded 50th for the UK Open itself, meaning he began at the second round stage, with a 5–4 win over Colin Osborne. He faced reigning champion Robert Thornton in the third round and led 6–4, before going on to lose 7–9. Edgar also qualified for two European Tour events during the year, losing in the first round of the Gibraltar Darts Trophy and beating Stuart Kellett 6–1 at the German Darts Championship before being defeated 6–2 by Paul Nicholson in the second round.

2014
Edgar began 2014 outside of the world's top 64 and entered Q School in an attempt to win his place back, coming closest on the third day when he advanced to the last 32 but lost 5–2 to Darron Brown. Edgar only had PDPA Associate Member status for the year ahead which allowed him to compete in UK Open and European Tour qualifiers as well as the Challenge Tour. He qualified for the UK Open and lost 5–3 to Spain's Antonio Alcinas in the second round. Edgar was a runner-up in the first Challenge Tour event of the year when he lost 5–4 to Jamie Robinson, but he went one better in the fourth event by claiming the title with a deciding leg victory over Mark Frost. He came within a match of qualifying for both the Grand Slam of Darts and 2015 World Championship but was beaten on both occasions.

2015
On the second day of 2015 Q School, Edgar won seven matches ending with a 5–0 whitewash of Andy Boulton to earn a new two-year tour card. He reached the quarter-finals of the third UK Open Qualifier, but was edged out 6–5 by Adrian Lewis. Edgar also suffered a narrow defeat in the second round of the UK Open, 5–4 against Jason Mold. The only European Tour event he could qualify for this year was the International Darts Open and he beat Darren Webster 6–5, but was thrashed 6–0 by Dave Chisnall in the second round.

2016
A last 16 showing in the final qualifier saw Edgar enter the UK Open at the second round stage and he beat Mark Wilson 6–4, before losing 9–3 to Mark Webster. He had two last 16 finishes in Players Championship events, before reaching the quarter-finals for the only time this season at the final one by defeating Jelle Klaasen, Wayne Jones, Cristo Reyes and Robbie Green, before losing 6–2 to Benito van de Pas. It was this result which saw Edgar make his debut in the Players Championship Finals and he lost 6–3 to Simon Whitlock in the first round.

2017
With his tour card status now expired, Edgar entered the 2017 Q School and finished 13th on the Order of Merit, just one point shy of reclaiming his place. A host of injuries including a broken hand restricted the amount of entries available through the year which included missing out on qualification for the PDC UK Open for the first time in his career. There were positive signs in the Summer when a second Challenge Tour title came beating Barrie Bates 5–2 in the final at Arena MK.

2018

Edgar re-gained his PDC Tour Card at 2018 Q school. Coming back onto the tour, he started with back-to-back last 16 runs in the UK Open Qualifiers held in Wigan and became a seed for the UK Open 2018. There, where he reached the 4th round for the 2nd time in his career, missing out 10–7 to Steve West following a 10–4 win over John Henderson in round 3. Edgar made his return to the European Rour in April 2018, going down 6–2 to Steve West in Saarbrücken.

Edgar did enough on the Players Championship circuit to qualify for the 2018 Players Championship Finals where he met Michael van Gerwen in the first round and lost 6–2. He also managed to qualify for the 2019 PDC World Darts Championship through the ProTour.

2019

In the 2019 PDC World Darts Championship, Edgar played Darius Labanauskas in the first round and lost 3–1 despite winning the first set.

Edgar started the year off placed world number 68, so to maintain his tour card for next season he needed to jump 4 places in the rankings. He played in the 2019 UK Open where he made the third round before losing to Ryan Searle 6–3. He qualified again for the Players Championship Finals that year and played Dave Chisnall in the first round. He lost 6–2.

2020

Edgar hadn’t managed to do enough on the tour to qualify for the 2020 World Darts Championship. He entered the last chance qualifier and managed to come through it with wins over Tytus Kanik, Gary Eastwood and Christian Bunse, before beating Adam Hunt 7–4 to book his place at Alexandra Palace. However, he lost to Darius Labanauskas once again. 

He was unable to achieve qualification for a 3rd year running for the Players Championship Finals, however the day after the Players Championship Final at the Ricoh Arena in Coventry, he qualified for the 2021 PDC World Darts Championship via the UK Tour Card Holder Qualifiers, beating Josh Payne 7-2 in the last 8 to confirm his place in his 3rd successive World Championship Finals.

2021

Edgar finally progressed past the 1st round of the World Championship in the 2021 edition by beating Maik Kuivenhoven 3-0. In round 2, he lost 3-1 to Mensur Suljović.

2022

Matthew returned to PDC Q-School looking to regain his tour card. During the first 3 days, Edgar picked up 0 points, which left him needing to reach the Final on Day 4 as a minimum. The day brought the best out in Edgar, and he progressed to the Semi-Finals, the highlight being a 106.35 average against Kai Fan Leung in the Last 64. Unfortunately for Matt, he lost against Nathan Rafferty in the Semi-Final, leaving him outside of the Tour Card spots in the Q-School Order of Merit.

Practice and personal life
Edgar practices with former world championship runner-up Kevin Painter. He has previously worked for Northampton Town as a sports coach. Edgar also runs a YouTube channel dedicated to darts called "Edgar TV", where he regularly answers questions raised by followers and chronicles his journeys through various PDC competitions.

Before starting his darts career, Edgar was a professional wrestler and trained in mixed martial arts.

World Championship results

PDC
2019: First round (lost to Darius Labanauskas 1–3)
2020: First round (lost to Darius Labanauskas 0–3)
2021: Second round (lost to Mensur Suljović 1–3)

Performance timeline

References

External links

Article on Matt Edgar on Red Dragon

1986 births
Living people
English darts players
Professional Darts Corporation former tour card holders